Nicholas Tamsin (born 10 December 1989) is a Belgian footballer who plays as a defender for Mandel United in the Belgian National Division 1.

Football career
Tamsin progressed through the youth teams of FC De Barms Sijsele and Cercle Brugge. He almost reached the first team of the latter in 2008, but was not deemed ready for the highest division and signed with second-tier club Turnhout. In the summer of 2010, he returned to the highest tier, after Zulte Waregem signed him on a two-year contract.

Tamsin made his debut in the Belgian First Division A on 23 October 2010, coming on as a substitute for Steve Colpaert against Lierse during half-time. After one season with Zulte Waregem, he moved to ambitious second-tier club Waasland-Beveren, but only stayed there for six months before moving to third tier club Coxyde. He continued to play for the team for almost five seasons. After the relegation from the Belgian Second Division, he signed with Knokke, another coastal club. Later, he would also appear for Sint-Eloois-Winkel and Mandel United.

References

External links
 Guardian Stats Centre
 

1989 births
Living people
Belgian footballers
Belgian Pro League players
Association football defenders
Challenger Pro League players
S.V. Zulte Waregem players
S.K. Beveren players
K.V.V. Coxyde players
Royal FC Mandel United players
Cercle Brugge K.S.V. players
Sint-Eloois-Winkel Sport players